A by-election was held for the New South Wales Legislative Assembly seat of Kogarah on 17 July 1948. It was triggered by the death of William Currey.

Dates

Results 

William Currey died.

See also
Electoral results for the district of Kogarah
List of New South Wales state by-elections

References 

1948 elections in Australia
New South Wales state by-elections
1940s in New South Wales
July 1948 events in Australia